Tockus is a genus of birds in the hornbill family, Bucerotidae, which are native to Africa.

Description 
Hornbills in the genus Tockus are medium-sized African birds with triangular shaped curved bills. They can be found in tropical and sub-tropical African grasslands, forests and savannahs. They all have long tail feathers which are black on the exterior and white on the interior.

Species

 Monteiro's hornbill (Tockus monteiri)
 Red-billed hornbill group
 Northern red-billed hornbill (Tockus erythrorhynchus)
 Damara red-billed hornbill (Tockus damarensis)
 Southern red-billed hornbill (Tockus rufirostris)
 Tanzanian red-billed hornbill (Tockus ruahae)
 Western red-billed hornbill (Tockus kempi)
 Yellow-billed hornbill group
 Southern yellow-billed hornbill (Tockus leucomelas)
 Eastern yellow-billed hornbill (Tockus flavirostris)
 Von der Decken's hornbill (Tockus deckeni)
 Jackson's hornbill (Tockus jacksoni)

References 
 Gordon Lindsay Maclean - Robert's Birds of South Africa, 6th Edition

 
Bird genera